MilkDrop is a hardware-accelerated music visualization plugin for Winamp and Kodi, which was originally developed by Ryan Geiss in 2001. It uses DirectX and intelligent beat detection to render iterated images which blend seamlessly. MilkDrop uses a complex system of interpolation to transition between presets gradually through time, creating a constantly changing visual experience.

Presets
MilkDrop is an environment for running presets, software which controls MilkDrop, and does not produce visualizations by itself.

Presets are saved in  file format, typically in a subfolder of the MilkDrop plugin directory.  Creating new presets is generally referred to as authoring, or writing, making the person that wrote a preset its author.  Presets are distributed on the Internet through Winamp, the Winamp forums, and through the personal webpages of MilkDrop preset authors. A preset's title also doubles as its  save name, and usually includes the preset author or authors' pseudonym.  MilkDrop presets often have more than one author, which is generally referred to as remixing or editing.  A remix or an edit will often include these terms in the preset's title.

Creating presets

A current  file is composed of four major different kinds of scriptable equations.  These include  and  equations, as well as custom shapes and custom waves.

Code in the per_frame section is executed once for each frame, modifying variables which affect different parameters that can be passed to other areas of code.  Trigonometric functions which modify MilkDrop's internal looping time variable, systems of logic, and interaction with the audio information received from Winamp or other applicable media player's Fast Fourier transform (FFT) can be used to govern how these parameters evolve through time.

Code in the  section of MilkDrop is not actually re-evaluated at every pixel as the name would suggest, rather the screen is divided into a grid and the code is evaluated at each grid point. The pixels in-between these points interpolate their values from the surrounding four points on the grid. The size of the grid is 32×24 by default, but can be set higher or lower by the user.   equations allow the preset author to alter some of MilkDrop's parameters differently in certain areas of the screen based upon x and y values, distance from the center of the screen, and the angle.

Custom shapes and custom waves each have variables which allow the author to change the shape, size, color, and location on screen, among other things.  Shapes and custom waves each have internal  code that affects these variables similarly to how  equations affect the entire preset.  Custom shapes and waves equations are included in MilkDrop version 1.04 and later. While initially MilkDrop allowed four custom shapes and waves, the latest version of the MilkDrop beta allows up to five custom shapes and five custom waves to be utilized per preset.

History
Milkdrop is the successor of an earlier music visualization software by Ryan Geiss, the geiss plugin for Winamp, released around 1998. The geiss plugin did the real-time music visualization purely software rendered by utilizing the CPU effectively by highly optimized, hand-tuned assembly code.

In 2001 the first version of milkdrop was written, built around the now widely available GPU hardware. Ryan Geiss released 12 versions of MilkDrop between 5 November 2001 and 31 July 2003.

Originally closed source, version 1.04 Milkdrop's source code was released under the BSD license in May 2005. Geoff "Redi Jedi" Potter has taken up developing the program since 2005 and has released six beta versions.

With the availability of the source code, MilkDrop has been ported to many platforms: for instance to XBMC (now Kodi), a homebrew developed media player that can be downloaded for Xbox, PC, or as a LiveCD.

projectM is an implementation of MilkDrop using OpenGL in C++, and is released under the GNU LGPL. It is available as a plugin for Audacious, XMMS, Winamp, iTunes, Jack, PulseAudio, foobar2000, Windows Media Player, VLC media player and XBMC. The VLC versions 2.2.0 and higher no longer support the projectM plugin. It comes natively with Clementine, Poweramp, and Qmmp that are also available in the Play Store on Android.

MilkDrop 2.0 was released in 2007, introducing Per Pixel Shader support. It is available with Winamp 5.5 or from projectM in their 2.0.1 version for use with other players like the VLC media player. MilkDrop 2 added DirectX 9.0 support and added the ability to use pixel shaders in its presets.

The source code for MilkDrop 2.25c has been released on 15 May 2013.

Milkdrop is implemented in Winamp (actual 5.66).

Reception 
In 2011, Milkdrop was retrospectively described as "the greatest single work of art produced during the naughties".

According to the Winamp main download page, the milkdrop plugin and its predecessor Geiss were the most downloaded plugins overall, with 2,737,890 and 4,686,010 downloads (on 10 August 2014), respectively.

The Flickernoise software for the Milkymist One video synthesizer is largely inspired by MilkDrop, and is compatible with MilkDrop presets to some extent.

Butterchurn
Butterchurn (2018) is a web implementation of the original source code of Milkdrop released on the WinAmp forum in 2007.

2020
Butterchurn v2.6.7.1e-complete (2020-08-20) is easy to implement with example webpage and extended functions and implementation manual.

See also

 Advanced Visualization Studio (AVS)
 Music visualization

References

External links 
 
 MilkDrop forums
 (Winamp Forums - MilkDrop)  for web with manual and music  
 (Butterchurnviz) for web 2018
 Collection of Milkdrop Presets and Some additional Info about Milkdrop
 MilkDrop Review
 milkshake, WebGL implementation

Free graphics software
Free music software
Music visualization software
Software using the BSD license
Windows-only free software
2001 software
Computer art